The diocese of Phú Cường is a Roman Catholic diocese in southern Vietnam. Since 2012 the bishop of the diocese has been Joseph Nguyễn Tấn Tước.  The diocese in its present form was founded on October 14, 1965. By 2013, the diocese of Phú Cường had about 141,239 Catholics (4.8% of the population), 161 priests and 96 parishes.

The diocese covers an area of 10,855 km², and is a suffragan diocese of the Archdiocese of Ho Chi Minh city.

Sacred Heart Cathedral in Thủ Dầu Một City is the Cathedral of the diocese.

Bishops
    Joseph Phạm Văn Thiên (14 October 1965 - 10 May 1993)
    Louis Hà Kim Danh (10 May 1993 - 22 February 1995)
    Peter Trần Đình Tứ (5 November 1998 - 30 June 2012)
    Joseph Nguyễn Tấn Tước (30 June 2012 – present)

References

External links
Diocese of Phú Cường website

Phu Cuong
Christian organizations established in 1965
Roman Catholic dioceses and prelatures established in the 20th century
Phu Cuong, Roman Catholic Diocese of